The 2008 Adamawa State gubernatorial by-election occurred on April 26, 2008. Incumbent PDP Governor Murtala Nyako won re-election in the supplementary election, defeating ACN candidate to emerge winner.

Murtala Nyako emerged winner in the PDP gubernatorial primary election. His running mate was Bala James Ngilari.

Electoral system
The Governor of Adamawa State is elected using the plurality voting system.

Results
There were 12 parties registered with the Independent National Electoral Commission to contest in the re-run election. The two main contenders were PDP Governor Murtala Nyako, who won the contest, and ACN's Markus Gundiri, who follows closely.

References 

Adamawa State gubernatorial elections
Adamawa State gubernatorial election
April 2008 events in Nigeria